Divine Ikubor (born 1 May 2000), known professionally as Rema, is a Nigerian singer, songwriter, and rapper. He rose to stardom after releasing the song "Dumebi". In 2019, he signed a record deal with Jonzing World, a subsidiary of Mavin Records.

Early life 
Divine Ikubor was born into a Christian family in Benin City. He grew up singing and rapping while he was in secondary school. He attended his primary and secondary school education at Ighile Group of Schools, Edo State. His father and elder brother are deceased, and Rema is left to look after his mother.

Career 
He started his music career in churches with Alpha P. In 2018. Rema posted a viral freestyle on Instagram to D'Prince's track "Gucci Gang". The post caught the attention of D'Prince who flew him to Lagos to offer a record deal to the young talent. Rema signed a record deal with D'Prince's Jonzing World, a subsidiary of Mavin Records owned by record producer Don Jazzy, in 2019.  He went on to release his self-titled debut EP "Rema" in 2019, which peaked at number 1 on Apple Music Nigeria. On 21 May 2019, Jonzing World, and Mavins released the music video of "Dumebi", a major breakout song from his self-titled EP, featuring a cameo appearance from Diana Eneje. The video was directed by Ademola Falomo and currently has 60 million views on YouTube. Later that summer, In 2019, one of his other most popular songs from the EP gained more popularity when it was placed on former president of the United States of America, Barack Obama's summer playlist.

In May 2021, Rema announced he will be calling his sound "Afrorave", a subgenre of Afrobeats with influences of Arabian and Indian music which has led to him having one of the strongest fanbases in the country known as Ravers.

In September 2021, Rema was unveiled as a brand ambassador for the popular soft drink Pepsi alongside his label mate Ayra Starr.

On 7 November 2022, Rema received an award on stage during his London concert as his songs achieved 1 billion streams worldwide.

Rave & Roses 
After Rema signed a record deal with Jonzing World in 2019, he released his debut EP Rema. After two more EPs, he released his debut album Rave & Roses on 25 March 2022. The album includes 16 tracks and features from 6lack, Chris Brown, AJ Tracey, and Yseult. The album charted 10 songs on the US Billboard Afrobeats Chart following its debut week. His single "Calm Down", including a sample from fellow Nigerian artist Crayon's track "So Fine", then began charting five months after its official release. It then became the most-viewed Afrobeats video on Youtube. On August 26, 2022, he released a remix of his song "Calm Down" with Selena Gomez which debuted at number 91 on Billboard Hot 100.

On February 2023, Rema received the Digital Artist of the Year award at the Soundcity MVP Awards which were held at the Eko Convention Centre in Lagos.

Awards 
On 19 October 2019, Rema won Next Rated and was nominated for Viewer's Choice at the 13th edition of The Headies. On 12 January 2020, he received the Soundcity MVP Awards for the best new artist. On 15 June 2020, Rema was nominated as Best Viewers Choice: International Act on the 2020 BET Awards. He was nominated on the awards alongside Burna Boy and Wizkid, they were the only Nigerian artists nominated for the awards edition of 2020. Rema's track Woman reached number fifteen on World Digital Song Sales

Personal life 
Rema is a supporter of football club Manchester United F.C. He also made it known to Twitter that he has gained admission to the university of Lagos to fulfill his mother's dream to get a degree.

On 28 September 2020, Rema tweeted accusations against the Peoples Democratic Party (PDP) over the death of his father Justice Ikubor, who was a former chieftain of the party.

In culture 
In September 2020, Rema's songs were included on the FIFA 21 soundtracks.

Discography

Studio albums

Compilation albums

Extended plays

Singles

Official videos 
 "Dumebi" (2019) 
 "Bad Commando" (2019) 
 "Lady" (2019) 
 "Beamer (Bad Boys)" (2020) 
 "Ginger Me" (2020) 
 "Woman" (2020) 
 "Bounce" (2020) 
 "Soundgasm" (2021) 
 "Calm Down" (2022) 
 "FYN" (2022) 
 "Holiday" (2023)

Awards and nominations

References

External links 
 Rema at allmusic

2000 births
Living people
Musicians from Benin City
Nigerian male rappers
Nigerian male singers
21st-century Nigerian musicians
21st-century Nigerian male singers
21st-century rappers